William Edgar Tuttle Jr. (December 10, 1870 – February 11, 1923) was an American Democratic Party politician who represented New Jersey's 5th congressional district in the United States House of Representatives for two terms from 1911 to 1915.

Early life and career
Tuttle was born in Horseheads, New York on December 10, 1870. He graduated from Horseheads High School and Elmira Free Academy in 1887 and attended Cornell University for two years. He was engaged in the lumber business in Westfield, New Jersey. Tuttle was a delegate to the Democratic National Convention in 1908 and 1916.

Congress
Tuttle was elected as a Democrat to the Sixty-second and Sixty-third Congresses, serving in office from March 4, 1911 – March 3, 1915, but was an unsuccessful candidate for reelection in 1914 to the Sixty-fourth Congress.

Later career and death
After leaving Congress, he resumed the lumber business. He was United States commissioner to the Panama-Pacific International Exposition in 1916. He served as president of the State board of conservation and development in 1919 and as State commissioner of banking and insurance in 1921.

Tuttle died in Westfield on February 11, 1923. he was interred in Maple Grove Cemetery in Horseheads, New York.

Notes

William Edgar Tuttle Jr. at The Political Graveyard

References 

1870 births
Democratic Party members of the United States House of Representatives from New Jersey
1923 deaths
Cornell University alumni
People from Westfield, New Jersey
People from Horseheads, New York